Kolmar may refer to:
 the German name for the town of Chodzież in Poland
 the German name for the commune of Colmar in France
 Gertrud Kolmar, a German lyric poet

See also
 Kreis Kolmar in Posen, a "county" in the Prussian province of Posen (1879-1919)